This is the discography of Canadian rock band Danko Jones.

Albums

EPs and others 
Sugar Chocolate 7" (1998) (Sonic Unyon)
Danko Jones EP (1998) (Sonic Unyon)
My Love Is Bold (1999) (Sound King / Outside Music)
I'm Alive and on Fire (2001) (Bad Taste Records)
Ritual of the Savage 10" (split with Gluecifer & Peter Pan Speedrock) (2003) (Drunken Maria / Suburban)
B-Sides (2009) (Bad Taste Records)
This Is Danko Jones (2009) (Canadian-only greatest hits release) (Emd Int'l Records)
Having Fun on Stage with Danko Jones 7" (2009) (Yeah Right! Records)
Mouth to Mouth (2011) (digital-only release)
Bring on the Mountain (2012) (DVD)

Singles

As a featured artist 

 2017 - "Black Rose"  - Volbeat Featuring Danko Jones

Compilations 
"The Return of Jackie and Judy", from The Song Ramones the Same (2002) (White Jazz / MNW)
"Bounce" from How We Rock (2002) (Burning Heart)
"The Mango Kid" from "The Vinyl Factory, Vol. 1" (1999) (MMS/Brilliant)
"Dr. Evening" from Now We Are 5 (1998) (Sonic Unyon)
"Samuel Sin" from Go! 50 Canadian Punk/HC Bands (1996) (Fans of Bad Productions)
"I Gotta Calm Down" 7"/CD with Prog Punk band Removal

Videography 
"I Believed In God" from the album Rock and Roll Is Black and Blue (2013) - by the DiamondBrothers
"Just a Beautiful Day" from the album Rock and Roll Is Black and Blue (2012) - by the DiamondBrothers
"I Think Bad Thoughts" from the album Below the Belt (2010) - by the DiamondBrothers
"Had Enough" from the album Below the Belt (2010) - by the DiamondBrothers
"Full of Regret" from the album Below the Belt (2010) - by the DiamondBrothers
"Sugar High" from the album B-Sides (2009) - Director George Vale
"King of Magazines" from the album Never Too Loud (2008) - by Nick Cross and Steve Stefanelli w/ Dave Cooper
"Code of the Road" from the album "Never Too Loud" (2008) - Director George Vale
"Take Me Home" from the album Never Too Loud (2008) - Director George Vale
Live in Stockholm DVD (2006) (Live Zone / Bad Taste)
"Don't Fall in Love" from the album Sleep Is the Enemy (2006) - Director Oskar Gullstrand
"First Date" from the album Sleep Is The Enemy (2006) - Director Micah Meisner
"Baby Hates Me" from the album Sleep Is the Enemy (2006) - Director Chris Grismer
"I Love Living in the City" from the album We Sweat Blood (2004) - Director Hanna Lejonqvist
"Dance" from the album We Sweat Blood (2003) - Director Kalle Haglund
"I Want You" from the album We Sweat Blood (2003) - Director Craig Bernard
"Lovercall" from the album Born a Lion (2002) - Director Craig Bernard
"Sound of Love" from the album Born a Lion (2002) - Director Craig Bernard
"Cadillac" from the album I'm Alive and on Fire (2001) - Director Jason Romilly
"My Love Is Bold" from the E.P. My Love Is Bold (2000) - Director Jason Romilly
"Bounce" from the E.P. My Love Is Bold (2000) - Director Jason Romilly

References 

Discographies of Canadian artists
Rock music discographies